The Tales of Hermann (German: Hermanns Erzählungen) is a 1926 German silent film directed by Kurt Stanke and starring Margarete Kupfer, Hermann Picha, and Josef Reithofer.

The film's sets were designed by August Rinaldi.

Cast
 Margarete Kupfer as Margarethe, die Köchin  
 Hermann Picha as Hermann, das Faktotum  
 Josef Reithofer as Franz, der Chauffeur  
 Hella Londa as Irma, das Hausmädchen / Manja  
 Curt von der Wyck as Der junge Herr  
 Iwan Iwanoff as Carfamba  
 Hang-Kong as Mongolischer Konsul 
 Eric Jackson as Jean, der Diener

References

Bibliography
 Alfred Krautz. International directory of cinematographers, set- and costume designers in film, Volume 4. Saur, 1984.

External links

1926 films
Films of the Weimar Republic
German silent feature films
German black-and-white films